Alfredo Hoyos may refer to:

 Alfredo Castillero Hoyos, Panamanian political scientist, human rights activist and professor
 Alfredo Hoyos (doctor) (born 1972), Colombian plastic surgeon